Ana Luiza Nunes Azevedo (born 24 November 1959) is a Brazilian filmmaker.

Biography
Azevedo graduated from Federal University of Rio Grande do Sul with a degree in fine arts in 1986; she is a member of Casa de Cinema de Porto Alegre. She was assistant director of several feature films, by directors such as Jorge Furtado, Carlos Gerbase and Carlos Reichenbach.

As a screenwriter and director, she has made short films and television specials, having won awards at various national and international festivals. Her film "Três Minutos" was the only Brazilian representative in the competition of short films at the 2000 Cannes Film Festival. At the end of 2007, she directed her first feature film, Antes Que o Mundo Acabe, based on the book by Marcelo Carneiro da Cunha, which was presented and awarded at some festivals, even before its commercial release, in May 2010. Between 2008 and 2009, Azevedo directed eight episodes of the series Fantasias de um Housewife for RBS TV. Azevedo worked on the pre-production of Mulher de Fases, a comedy series based on a book by Cláudia Tajes, which aired in 2011 on HBO Brasil.

References

1959 births
Living people
People from Porto Alegre
Brazilian women film directors
Brazilian film directors
Brazilian screenwriters
Brazilian television directors
Federal University of Rio Grande do Sul alumni
Women television directors
Brazilian women screenwriters
20th-century screenwriters
20th-century Brazilian women writers
21st-century screenwriters
21st-century Brazilian women writers